KRI Teluk Youtefa (522) is the fifth  of the Indonesian Navy. The ship was commissioned in July 2021.

Characteristics
She has a capacity of 476 passengers, including crew, alongside 10 Leopard main battle tanks and a helicopter. The ship was designed to be able to stay at sea for 20 days. The ship is armed with light defensive weapons in form of a Bofors 40 mm gun and two 12.7 mm heavy machine guns. The vessel could also carry four LCVP boats, and is equipped with a crane for cargo loading and offloading.

Service history
KRI Teluk Youtefa was built by an Indonesian shipbuilder PT Daya Radar Utama (DRU), Bandar Lampung. The ship was ordered from DRU as part of a three-ship order of the Teluk Bintuni-class (AT-117 type LST program) ships in January 2017, with yard number of AT-5. The ship was laid down on 10 July 2017, along with two other ships, AT-6 and AT-7. She was launched and officially named on 15 May 2019. Teluk Youtefa was commissioned on 12 July 2021, with Sea Lieutenant Colonel I Nyoman Armenthia W. as her first commanding officer.

References

External links

2019 ships
Teluk Bintuni-class tank landing ships
Amphibious warfare vessels of the Indonesian Navy